This is a list of the tallest buildings in the country of Georgia. Many are located in the seaside city of Batumi, including the Batumi Tower, the tallest building in Georgia. The Biltmore Hotel is the tallest building in Tbilisi, the capital.

Completed & under construction structures

References

Tallest
Georgia
Georgia